The 15th edition of the Turkmenistan President's Cup was played from February 20 to 28 with the participation of eight clubs.

Three of the eight teams participating in the 15th edition of the tournament competed for the Cup for the first time – the runners-up of Kyrgyzstan League, a participant of ‘the golden match’ in the national championships FC Abdysh-Ata, FC Hemmat from Iran and the youth team from Bahrain.

The bronze-medal winner of Virsliga, the 1996 Turkmenistan President's Cup finalist Skonto Rīga and the bronze-medal winner of the championships of Armenia FC Gandzasar Kapan competed in the tournament for the second time. The defending Turkmenistan President's Cup winner HTTU Aşgabat– for the fourth time, a finalist of the 2007 and 2008 international tournaments FC Aşgabat made the third attempt to win the prize.

The teams were split in two groups: Group A – Defending champions Turkmenistan's HTTU Aşgabat was pooled with Kyrgyzstan runners-up Abdysh-Ata, Latvian giants Skonto and Iranian outfit Hemmat Golestan; Group B – Tajikistan runners-up Parvoz, Gandzasar from Armenia, Bahrain youth team and Turkmenistan champions Aşgabat were in Group B.

Two best teams in each group qualified to the final stage and competed for the main prize, the runners-up competed for the third place.

The winning team was awarded with US$20,000 while the runners-up team was given US$10,000.

HTTU beat Aşgabat 2–1 in the final of previous year.

Participating teams

Group stage
All times are local (UTC+5)

Group A

Results

Group B

Results

Knockout stage

Semi finals

Third-place play-off

Final

Top scorers

Notes
 FC Hemmat is the only team at this tournament players of which were unable to score a single goal.

2009
President's Cup